Karasica may refer to:

 Karasica, Poland, a village in Poland
 Karašica, two rivers in Croatia and Hungary